Daan Utsav was formerly known as The Joy of Giving Week. The Joy of Giving Week (JGW) is a "festival of philanthropy" that aims to become a part of the Indian ethos, with the Week being celebrated every year covering Gandhi Jayanti by engaging people through "acts of giving" - money, time, resources and skills - spanning the corporate, NGO and government sectors, schools, colleges and the general public. Originally called "India Giving Week", the name "Joy of Giving Week" emerged from a set of choices provided by the ad agency, Euro RSCG India, which provided PR, creative and media services for the ‘Joy of Giving Week’.
This initiative was supported by many NGO's and Corporates. Corporate participate with this venture to fulfill their CSR (Corporate Social Responsibility) function.

Initiatives undertaken

Several corporates, celebrities and organizations have undertaken efforts towards awareness, volunteering and fundraising events that they will organize during the Joy of Giving Week. A brief outline on some of the initiatives that have taken place during the Week in 2009.

FOR CHANGE

The Design for Giving School Contest inspires children between the age group 10-13 from over 10,000 private and government schools all over India to design solutions to India's problems and implement them during the Week. Presented by Riverside School in Ahmedabad, NID, Stanford Design School and IDEO, in partnership with hundreds of educational NGOs and schools across India.

Clothes collection drive

Goonj runs a Vastradaan initiative that provides clothes and other amenities to the far-flung villages, collecting on an average 20,000 kg or about 1.2 lac units of clothing every month, processing it and distributing it through a unique clothes for work program.  For the Joy of Giving Week, Goonj has undertaken a massive clothes collection drive in over 25 cities, targeting to collect at least 1 crore units of clothing during the week.

Stories of Joy

Stories of Joy brings together five short films that carry the message of Joy of Giving through interesting stories.

A Real Joy Ride

College Joyfest

A "College Joyfest" to promote awareness and sensitivity among youth of 300+ college campuses in India catalyzing as fundraisers for the partner with local NGOs during the cultural festivals. The initiative was being led by JAM Magazine JAM Magazine and was being supported by MTV India.

7Days7Gifts

7Days7Gifts, a simple idea where people will be encouraged to do random acts of kindness to people they don’t know for every day of the week. The 7 Day gifting challenge aims to take the focus away from you on to others. The only real condition here is that each gift should be meaningful and some thought should have gone into it.

Battle of the Buffet

"Battle of the Buffet" events by the 5 star Hotels in Chennai and Hyderabad, where they provided their most lavish spreads free of cost to NGOs of the city, who worked together as a city and sell donor passes to raise funds for their work.

Hi5 Club

Hi5 Club is an event by Bhumi and volunteers.org to engage college students and young people in volunteering for a cause of their choice for five hours during Daan Utsav. Students can volunteer either on the structured opportunities provided by Bhumi (5 hrs of teaching, cleaning a beach/park, visiting an elderly home, making educational aids, sorting out clothes or doing a collection drive, etc.), or can identify their own activity.

Celebrities Support for the Week

Celebrities from various facets supported various initiatives during the week. 
 Sports - Sachin Tendulkar, Rahul Dravid, Geet Sethi, Prakash Padukone, Gopichand
 Cinema - Shahrukh Khan, Saif Ali Khan, Deepika Padukone, Nandita Das, Imtiaz Ali, Shriya Saran, Surya Sivakumar, Madhavan, Mini Mathur 
 Corporate - Narayana Murthy, Kumar Birla, KV Kamath, Adi Godrej, Deepak Parekh, Ajay Piramal

References

Other websites
 Joy Of Giving Week

Entertainment events in India